Turkey Creek is an unincorporated community in Pike County, Kentucky, United States. Their post office closed in November 1996.

References

Unincorporated communities in Pike County, Kentucky
Unincorporated communities in Kentucky